Synthlibonotus is a genus of broad-nosed weevils in the family Curculionidae distributed in northern South America.

Taxonomy 
Synthlibonotus belongs in the tribe Eustylini. It was described for the first time by Carl Johan Schönherr in 1847 (p. 41).

Description 
The genus Synthlibonotus was characterized by Schönherr as follows:

Synthlibonotus resembles some members of the genus Exophthalmus but can be distinguished by their long antennal scapes that reach beyond the anterior margin of the pronotum. The scale coverage can be relatively dense and uniform or essentially absent. There is noticeable sexual dimorphism, with females much broader than males.

Distribution 
Members of the genus Synthlibonotus can be found in Mexico, Guatemala, Colombia, and Venezuela.

Species 
The genus contains three described species:

 Synthlibonotus rufipes Schönherr, 1847: 41: Colombia, Venezuela.
 Synthlibonotus scapha Faust, 1892: 18: Venezuela.
 Synthlibonotus viator Chevrolat, 1880: XLII: Guatemala, Mexico.

References 

Entiminae